The Edel New is a South Korean single-place, paraglider that was designed and produced by Edel Paragliders of Gwangju. It is now out of production.

Design and development
The New was designed as an intermediate glider and introduced to the market in 2003. The models are each named for their relative size.

Variants
New S
Small-sized model for lightweight pilots. The glider model is DHV 2 certified.
New M
Mid-sized model for medium-weight pilots. The glider model is DHV 2 certified.

Specifications (New M)

References

New
Paragliders